Hinchman is an unincorporated community located in Berrien County, Michigan. It is centrally located near the intersection of Scottsdale and East Hinchman Road in Oronoko Township near the cities of Bridgman and Stevensville.

References

Unincorporated communities in Berrien County, Michigan
Unincorporated communities in Michigan